Edendale, California may refer to:
Edendale, Los Angeles, California
Edendale, former name of Mount Eden, California